West Wiltshire was a non-metropolitan district in Wiltshire, England. It was abolished on 1 April 2009 and replaced by Wiltshire Council.

Political control
From the first election to the council in 1973 until its abolition in 2009, political control of the council was held by the following parties:

Leadership
The leaders of the council from 2003 until the council's abolition in 2009 were:

Council elections
1973 West Wiltshire District Council election
1976 West Wiltshire District Council election
1979 West Wiltshire District Council election
1983 West Wiltshire District Council election (New ward boundaries)
1987 West Wiltshire District Council election
1991 West Wiltshire District Council election
1995 West Wiltshire District Council election
1999 West Wiltshire District Council election
2003 West Wiltshire District Council election (New ward boundaries)
2007 West Wiltshire District Council election (New ward boundaries)

By-election results

1995–1999

1999–2003

2003–2007

2007–2011

References

November 1996 by-elections at gwydir.demon.co.uk

 
Council elections in Wiltshire
District council elections in England